Sahara Movie Studios or also known as (Sahara One Motion Pictures or Sahara Motion Pictures) was a film production company. They produced some films till 2004 to 2014. This company was owned by Sahara India Pariwar.

Filmography

Films Produced

Films Distributed

Unreleased/shelved films

References

External links
 Sahara One Motion Pictures at Bollywood Hungama

Indian film studios
Film production companies based in Mumbai
Indian subsidiaries of foreign companies
Mass media companies established in 2004
2004 establishments in Maharashtra
Sahara India Pariwar